The 1907–08 English football season was Birmingham Football Club's 16th in the Football League and their 8th in the First Division. They were in the relegation positions by mid-October, and only once, briefly, rose above them, finishing bottom of the 20-team league, four points adrift of safety, and were relegated to the Second Division for 1908–09. They also took part in the 1907–08 FA Cup, entering at the first round proper and losing in that round to West Bromwich Albion after a replay.

Alf Jones stepped down as secretary-manager at the end of the season. Jones began acting as unpaid secretary for Small Heath Alliance in 1885, the year the club turned professional, became their first paid secretary with responsibility for team matters in 1892, when the club first joined the Football League, and had held the post of secretary-manager ever since. He was succeeded by Alex Watson.

Twenty-eight players made at least one appearance in nationally organised first-team competition, and there were ten different goalscorers. Forward Benny Green played in 38 of the 40 matches over the season. Edmund Eyre was leading scorer with nine goals; in the league, Eyre and Green each scored eight.

Shortly before the match against Nottingham Forest in February was due to start, a severe gale blew sections of the corrugated-iron roof off the grandstand. Although the match went ahead, it was abandoned after 35 minutes because of the wind.

Football League First Division

League table (part)

FA Cup

Appearances and goals

Players with name struck through and marked  left the club during the playing season.

See also
Birmingham City F.C. seasons

References
General
 Matthews, Tony (1995). Birmingham City: A Complete Record. Breedon Books (Derby). .
 Matthews, Tony (2010). Birmingham City: The Complete Record. DB Publishing (Derby). .
 Source for match dates and results: "Birmingham City 1907–1908: Results". Statto Organisation. Retrieved 21 May 2012.
 Source for lineups, appearances, goalscorers and attendances: Matthews (2010), Complete Record, pp. 260–61. Note that attendance figures are estimated.
 Source for kit: "Birmingham City". Historical Football Kits. Retrieved 22 May 2018.

Specific

Birmingham City F.C. seasons
Birmingham